Rokan Hilir ("Lower Rokan") is a regency (kabupaten) of Riau Province, on Sumatra island, Indonesia. It occupies the lower part of the catchment area of the Rokan River, and has an area of 8,851.59 km2. It had a population of 553,216 at the 2010 census and 637,161 at the 2020 census. The administrative centre of the Rokan Hilir Regency is located at Bagansiapiapi.

History
The regency was split off from Bengkalis Regency on 4 October 1999.

Administrative districts 
As at 2010, the regency was divided into thirteen districts (kecamatan), but two additional districts (Kubu Babusalam and Pekaitan) were created by splitting of the Kubu and Bangko districts respectively; and more recently three more districts (Tanjung Medan, Bagan Sinembah Raya and Balai Jaya) were added by splitting of the Pujud and Bagan Sinembah districts respectively. The eighteen districts are listed below with their areas and populations at the 2010 census and the 2020 census. The table also includes the locations of the district administrative centres, and the number of villages (rural desa and urban kelurahan) in each district.

Notes: (a) the area and 2010 population of the new Tanjung Medan District is included in the figures for Pujud District, from which it was cut. (b) the areas and 2010 populations of the new Bagan Sinembah Raya District and Balai Jaya District are included in the figures for Bagan Sinembah District, from which they were cut. (c) the 2010 population of Kubu Babassalam District is included in the population figure for Kubu District, from which it was cut. (d) the 2010 population of Pekaitan District is included in the population figure for Bangko District, from which it was cut.

Towns with significant populations 

 Bagansiapiapi
 Bagan Batu
 Panipahan
 Ujung Tanjung
 Pulau Halang

References

Regencies of Riau